Vanes Norikovich Martirosyan (born May 1, 1986) is an Armenian-American former professional boxer who competed from 2005 to 2018. He challenged twice for a light middleweight world title in 2013 and 2016, and once for a unified middleweight world title in 2018.

Early life
Vanes was born on May 1, 1986, in Abovyan, Armenia. Vanes' father, Norik Martirosyan, was an amateur boxer in Armenia who worked for an industrial company and was also in the army. Vanes has two brothers, one older and one younger, and a sister.

His family moved to Glendale, California when he was four years old. He started boxing when he was seven after his father found out there was a gym in Glendale.

Martirosyan was taken out of junior high school by his father and became home-schooled once it had become clear that he needed to keep his son's fighting confined to the ring.

Amateur career
Martirosyan was an eight-time National Champion and a Golden Gloves Champion.

In 2004, after winning a match against Haiti's Andre Berto in the 1st AIBA American 2004 Olympic Qualifying Tournament in Tijuana, Mexico, Martirosyan secured a spot in the US Olympic Team. He represented the United States at the 2004 Olympics as a Welterweight at age 18. He was on the same Olympic team as Andre Ward and Andre Dirrell.

Results were:
Defeated Benamar Meskine (Algeria) 45–20
Lost to Lorenzo Aragón Armenteros (Cuba) 11–20

Martitosyan lost to in the second round to Aragon Armenteros who was 12 years his senior.

Notable boxers Martirosyan defeated as an amateur include Austin Trout (three times), Andre Berto, and Timothy Bradley.

He finished his amateur career with 120 wins and 10 losses.

Professional career

Early career

At the age of 20, Martirosyan turned professional at 154 pounds with Bob Arum's promotional company Top Rank. Vanes is managed by his uncle, Serge Martirosyan. He is also co-managed by Shelly Finkel, who also manages and advises world champions such as Wladimir and Vitali Klitschko, Evander Holyfield, Manny Pacquiao, among others.

Vanes was trained by Freddie Roach, who was voted 2003 and 2006 Trainer of the Year by the Boxing Writers Association of America. He trains alongside Roach's other top students, including Manny Pacquiao and Julio César Chávez, Jr.

Martirosyan has also worked with Ronnie Shields, winning his first fight under Shields's tutelage when he knocked out Dan Wallace in one round.

Martirosyan subsequently scored a shutout unanimous decision over Clarence Taylor, and also recorded wins against Billy Lyell (who would later topple previously unbeaten John Duddy), Harrison Cuello, Andrey Tsurkan and Willie Lee.

Martirosyan was scheduled to make his HBO debut on June 5, 2010 in Yankee Stadium on the Miguel Cotto vs. Yuri Foreman undercard. His opponent was fellow undefeated prospect Joe Greene (22-0, 14 KOs). Martirosyan handed Greene the first loss of his career by way of unanimous decision. With this win Martirosyan, advanced to 28–0 with 17 wins coming by way of knockout.

On March 19, 2011 Vanes made his next appearance in the ring at the Bell Centre in Montreal, Quebec. He got an easy win over Mexican Bladimir Hernandez by way of KO in the second round.

His next fight was against veteran Saúl Román in a WBC semi-final title eliminator for the vacant WBC Silver Light Middleweight Championship. The bout was on June 4, 2011 in HBO's televised portion of the Julio César Chávez, Jr. vs. Sebastian Zbik undercard. Román knocked Vanes down in the first round and gave him trouble in the next two. Martirosyan came back in the fourth and fifth. When the seventh round began, Román cornered Vanes against the ropes and landed several blows. Vanes may have caught Román just in time from being stopped. In the same round, Vanes trapped Román against the ropes and knocked him down. After Román got up, Vanes landed a hard right hook on his chin and followed up with a barrage of blows while Román was leaning on the ropes, causing the fight to be stopped and turning what seemed to be near-defeat into victory.

On October 29, 2011 Vanes fought contender Richard Gutierrez. Vanes dominated from start to finish and won a ten-round unanimous decision. The judges' scorecards were 100–90, 100-90 and 99–91; Vanes winning all but one round from one judge.

Martirosyan fought veteran Troy Lowry on the Julio César Chávez, Jr. vs. Marco Antonio Rubio undercard. Vanes knocked Lowry down in the first round and stopping him in the third to retain his WBC Silver title.

On November 9, 2013 Martirosyan was defeated on a split decision by Demetrius Andrade who on that day became a winner of the World Boxing Organization title.

On March 21, 2014 he appeared on ESPN's Goossen Tutor Promotions, defeating Mario Antonio Lozano via unanimous decision after 10 rounds in a fight for the vacant WBO Inter-Continental light middleweight title.

Martirosyan vs. Charlo
On February 17, 2015 Showtime announced that Martirosyan would appear on a doubleheader at the Palms Casino Resort in Las Vegas on March 28 against Jermell Charlo (25-0). The fight was contested over 10 rounds. Martirosyan lost a contentious unanimous decision. He was considered the more aggressive fighter. The scores were 97–93, 96–94, 96–94. Martirosyan felt he won the fight.

Martirosyan vs. Smith 
On September 12, 2015, Martirosyan fought Ishe Smith. Martirosyan outpointed Smith on two of the judges scorecards, 97-91 and 97-91, while the third judge had the fight a draw, 95-95, giving Martirosyan the majority decision victory.

Martirosyan vs. Lara 
In his next fight, Martirosyan fought Erislandy Lara for the WBA world super welterweight championship. Martirosyan got outboxed by Lara, and lost the fight via unanimous decision. The scorecards read 116-111, 116-111 and 115-112 in favour of Lara.

Martirosyan vs. Golovkin
On May 5, 2018 Martirosyan fought unified Middleweight champion Gennady Golovkin at the StubHub Center in Carson, California after he was chosen as the late replacement for Canelo Álvarez when Canelo withdrew from the much anticipated Cinco De Mayo rematch in the wake of his failed drug tests for Clenbuterol. With only three weeks of preparation for the bout and almost two years since his last professional fight, Martirosyan faced long odds against the undefeated middleweight champion. Although he performed better than expected in the opening round of the fight, Martirosyan eventually succumbed to Golovkin's power and suffered a quick defeat via knock out in the 2nd round. When speaking of Golovkin's power in the post-fight, Martirosyan said it felt like he was "being hit by a train." Golovkin said, "It feels great to get a knockout. Vanes is a very good fighter. He caught me a few times in the first round. In the second round, I came out all business after I felt him out in the first round." For the fight, Golovkin landed 36 of 84 punches thrown (43%) and Martirosyan landed 18 of his 73 thrown (25%). Martirosyan received a purse of $225,000 for the fight. The fight averaged 1,249,000 viewers and peaked at 1,361,000 viewers, making most-watched boxing match on cable television in 2018.

Professional boxing record

See also
 List of Armenian Americans

References

External links

 
 Stars are Aligned for Vanes Martirosyan
Vanes Martirosyan - Profile, News Archive & Current Rankings at Box.Live

1986 births
Living people
People from Abovyan
Boxers from California
Armenian male boxers
American male boxers
Soviet emigrants to the United States
American people of Armenian descent
Boxers at the 2004 Summer Olympics
Olympic boxers of the United States
Light-middleweight boxers
Ethnic Armenian sportspeople